William Braithwaite may refer to:
 William Stanley Braithwaite (1878–1962), African-American writer, poet, literary critic, anthologist, and publisher
 William Charles Braithwaite (1862–1922), British historian
 William Garnett Braithwaite (1870–1932), British Army officer
 William Thomas Braithwaite (1844–1918), Northern Irish businessman, freemason, and marksman